Leonard Russell Price (born September 21, 1942) is an American politician in the state of Minnesota. He served in the Minnesota State Senate.

References

Democratic Party Minnesota state senators
Democratic Party members of the Minnesota House of Representatives
1942 births
Living people
People from Woodbury, Minnesota
University of Minnesota alumni
University of Wisconsin–River Falls alumni